Carl-Gustaf Rossby (1898–1957) was a Swedish-born American meteorologist.

Rossby may also refer to:

 Rossby (crater), impact crater on Mars
 Rossby wave, a natural phenomenon in the atmosphere and oceans of planets
 Rossby number, a dimensionless number used in describing fluid flow. The Rossby number is the ratio of inertial
 Rossby parameter, used in geophysics and meteorology
 Rossby whistle, oscillation of sea-level and bottom pressure in the Caribbean Sea